Communauté d'agglomération Portes de France-Thionville is the communauté d'agglomération, an intercommunal structure, centred on the city of Thionville. It is located in the Moselle department, in the Grand Est region, northeastern France. Created in 2004, its seat is in Thionville. Its area is 156.5 km2. Its population was 80,927 in 2019, of which 40,778 in Thionville proper.

Composition
The communauté d'agglomération consists of the following 13 communes:

Angevillers
Basse-Ham
Fontoy
Havange
Illange
Kuntzig
Lommerange
Manom
Rochonvillers
Terville
Thionville
Tressange
Yutz

References

Portes de France-Thionville
Portes de France-Thionville